Yaw Brefo Darkwa-Dwamena is a Ghanaian politician and member of the first parliament of the second republic of Ghana representing Offinso constituency under the membership of the Progress Party.

Early life and education 
Darkwa-Dwamena was born on 23 March 1932 in the Ashanti region of Ghana. He attended Prempeh College, Kumasi. He thereafter moved to England to advance his education at the University of Hull where he obtained his Bachelor of Laws degree in law. He worked as a Barrister-at-Law before going into parliament.

Politics 
Darkwa-Dwamena began his political career in 1969 when he became the parliamentary candidate for the Progress Party (PP) to represent Offinso constituency prior to the commencement of the 1969 Ghanaian parliamentary election. He assumed office as a member of the first parliament of the second republic of Ghana on 1 October 1969 after being pronounced winner at the 1969 Ghanaian parliamentary election. His tenure ended on 13 January 1972.

Personal life 
Darkwa-Dwamena is a Christian and cocoa farmer.

References 

1932 births
People from Ashanti Region
Progress Party (Ghana) politicians
Ghanaian MPs 1969–1972
Alumni of the University of Hull
Living people
Ghanaian farmers
Prempeh College alumni
20th-century Ghanaian politicians
Ghanaian Christians
Barristers and advocates